Hope College is a private Christian liberal arts college in Holland, Michigan. It was originally opened in 1851 as the Pioneer School by Dutch immigrants four years after the community was first settled. The first freshman college class matriculated in 1862 and Hope received its state charter in 1866. Hope College is affiliated with the Reformed Church in America and retains a Christian atmosphere. Its  campus is adjacent to the downtown commercial district and has been shared with Western Theological Seminary since 1884.

History

Hope's motto is taken from Psalm 42:6: "Spera in Deo" ("Hope in God"). The college's emblem is an anchor. This is drawn from a speech by Albertus van Raalte, the leader of the community, on the occasion of the founding of the Pioneer School in 1851: "This is my anchor of hope for this people in the future," (an allusion to Hebrews 6:19). The primary-level Pioneer School was later expanded to secondary and college-level education as Hope College. Van Vleck Hall, which originally housed the Pioneer School, is the oldest building on campus (1858) and serves as a dormitory. It is the city's second-oldest building. The first college class matriculated in 1862, and Hope received its state charter in 1866. The college admitted its first female students in 1878.

2015 marked Hope College's 150th year of education. In honor of this, Hope held many events in 2015. The celebration began with the 150th commencement on May 3, 2015. The year held two grand openings, the Kruizenga Art Museum and the Jack H. Miller Center for Musical Arts, and the groundbreaking ceremony of the Jim and Martie Bultman Student Center. The college also sponsored the Presidential Colloquium lecture series, which featured an address by David Brooks on Christian education in the 21st century.

A marker designating the college as a Michigan Historic Site was erected in 2019 by the Michigan Historical Commission. The inscription reads:

In 1851, four years after settlers from the Netherlands founded Holland, the Pioneer School was established to meet some of the educational needs of the young colony. This school, the predecessor of Hope College, received direction and financial support from the General Synod of the Reformed Church in America. The school evolved into the Holland Academy, which in 1862 enrolled its first college class. On May 14, 1866, the institution was chartered as Hope College, and on July 17, 1866, the first class of eight students was graduated. The college’s name, seal, and motto are derived from a statement of the founder of Holland, Rev. Albertus C. Van Raalte, who said of the Pioneer School, “This is my Anchor of Hope for this people in the future.” In the decades that followed, a strong college of arts and sciences was developed which continues to serve the church and the community.

Presidents
The following people have presided over the college:

 Philip Phelps Jr. (1866–1878)
 Charles Scott (1878–1893)
 Gerrit J. Kollen (1893–1911, Hope College Class of 1868)
 Ame Vennema (1911–1918, Hope College Class of 1879)
 Edward D. Dimnent (1918–1931, Hope College Class of 1896)
 Wynand Wichers (1931–1945)
 Irwin J. Lubbers (1945–1963, Hope College Class of 1917)
 Calvin A. VanderWerf (1963–1970, Hope College Class of 1937)
 Gordon VanWylen (1972–1987)
 John H. Jacobson (1987–1999)
 James E. Bultman (1999–2013, Hope College Class of 1963)
 John C. Knapp (2013–2017)
 Dennis N. Voskuil (2017–2019, Interim)
 Matthew A. Scogin (2019–Present, Hope College Class of 2002)

Academics

The college offers 90+ majors, all of which lead to a Bachelor of Arts, Bachelor of Music, Bachelor of Science, Bachelor of Science in engineering, or Bachelor of Science in Nursing. It has a student population of about 3,400 with a student-to-faculty ratio of 12:1.
The college offers off-campus study programs in several cities, including Philadelphia, Washington, D.C., and Chicago, and overseas programs for the summer, semester, or an entire academic year. Among its international programs, a longstanding summer semester in Vienna is fairly popular among students.

Hope maintains strong ties to the Reformed Church in America.

In addition, Hope College is a member of the Great Lakes College Association.

Courses offered at Hope are divided into five disciplines:

 General Education: In General Education courses students encounter a diverse array of topics rooted in the liberal arts education. Regardless of their majors, students take courses in art, history, language, literature, math and sciences. They also participate in a First-Year Seminar course and a Senior Seminar course. These courses were developed to help transition students in and out of their college career.
Arts and Humanities: The Fine and Performing Arts degree at Hope College consists of four departments, which include Art and Art History, Dance, Music and Theatre. The Humanities division includes the departments of English, History, Modern and Classical Language, Philosophy and Religion.
 Natural and Applied Sciences: The Natural and Applied Sciences programs include Biology, Biochemistry and Molecular Biology, Chemistry, Computer Science, Engineering, Geological and Environmental Sciences, Mathematics, Neuroscience, Nursing and Physics.
Social Sciences: A Social Science degree consists of the departments of Communication, Economics and Business, Education, Kinesiology, Peace and Justice minor, Political Science, Psychology and Sociology/Social Work.
 Pre-health programs: There are a wide variety of pre-health programs at the undergraduate level. They include Chiropractic Medicine, Dentistry, Genetic Counseling, Medicine, Occupational Therapy, Optometry, Pharmacy, Physician Assistant, Physical Therapy, Podiatry, Public Health, Speech Language Pathology and Veterinary Medicine. Other pre-health professions include Nursing, Athletic Training, and Pre-clinical Psychology.

Hope's most popular majors, in terms of 2021 graduates, were:
Business Administration & Management (109)
Psychology (88)
Engineering (51)
Registered Nursing/Registered Nurse (42)
Exercise Science & Kinesiology (36)
Biology/Biological Sciences (32)
Speech Communication & Rhetoric (30)

Accreditation

Hope College is accredited by the Higher Learning Commission, with professional accreditation from the following:

 Accreditation Board for Engineering and Technology
 American Chemical Society
 Commission on Accreditation of Athletic Training Education
 Commission on Collegiate Nursing Education
 Council on Social Work Education
 National Association of Schools of Art and Design
 National Association of Schools of Dance
 National Association of Schools of Music
 National Association of Schools of Theatre

Campus life

Housing

On-campus housing is provided in 11 residence halls, 15 apartment buildings, and 70+ houses (called "cottages") that the college owns near the campus. A small percentage of students—primarily juniors, seniors, and Holland residents—live off-campus. All full-time students without commuter status are required to live in on-campus housing for three years.

Demographics

Most Hope students come from the greater Great Lakes region. In 2012 approximately 90% of the student body came from Michigan, Indiana, Illinois, New York, Ohio, Wisconsin, and Minnesota. Approximately 86% of the student body is white; students from minority backgrounds account for about 12% of the student body. Approximately 2% of the student body is international.

Student organizations

Student activities and organizations include Dance Marathon and Relay for Life, an FM radio station (WTHS), newspaper (The Anchor), literary magazine (Opus), and yearbook (Milestone), plus a variety of academic, musical, spiritual, literary, social and athletic clubs. About 10-12% of students belong to social fraternities and sororities, which are local to Hope rather than chapters of larger organizations, with the exception of one fraternity, Phi Sigma Kappa. The college holds Sunday evening worship services ("The Gathering") and Monday/Wednesday/Friday Chapel services on campus. Attendance at these events has been voluntary since 1970, yet students routinely fill Dimnent Memorial Chapel to its capacity of greater than 1,000 students at each service.

Campus traditions

The Pull

"The Pull" is an annual tug-of-war between the freshman and sophomore classes at Hope College. It takes place across the Black River in Holland on the last Saturday of September every year (until 1993 it was held on a Friday). The Pull dates to 1898. Each team has 18 students on the rope as "pullers," and another 18 acting as guides and morale boosters, or "moralers." The freshmen are coached by juniors, and the sophomores by seniors. This arrangement has led to the rivalry between even and odd year classes. Even year's colors are red and white, while Odd year's colors are maroon and gold. The competition is limited to three hours; it previously had no time limit. The winner is the team that takes the most rope.

The Nykerk Cup Competition

The Nykerk Cup is a multifaceted competition between freshmen and sophomore women involving song, play, and oration. As in the Pull, freshmen are coached by juniors and sophomores by seniors, also contributing to the "Odd Year" and "Even Year" competitions. The Nykerk Cup takes place during Family Weekend in late fall. The tradition was begun in 1935 by John Nykerk. Men participate in the competition as "moralers" by supporting the participants while building sets and coordinating scene changes.

Winter Fantasia

One formal dance is offered by the college in February. Students may attend in large groups or with dates, and the college offers transportation to Grand Rapids, where it takes place.

Dance Marathon

The students of Hope College hold the annual Dance Marathon to raise money for the Helen Devos Children's Hospital in Grand Rapids. This event takes place in the spring semester. Students volunteer to be dancers or moralers for the event. Dancers stand on their feet and dance for 24 hours while moralers take shifts supporting the dancers. Children of the hospital often visit to show their thanks.

Christmas Vespers

Each December, Hope College hosts a musical Christmas service in Dimnent Chapel. The service has been held annually since 1941 and features over 200 students, staff and faculty. It includes music performed by the Chapel Choir, College Chorus, Orchestra, and other small ensembles. There are four performances each year, all of which draw a crowd that fills the chapel. The event is regularly recorded and televised on PBS stations during the Christmas season.

Campus events

Hope routinely hosts well-known authors, speakers, scientists, and global leaders who present lectures on a wide variety of topics.

The Jack Ridl Visiting Writers Series brings in prominent authors for free public readings. The series is named for poet and Hope College professor emeritus Jack Ridl, who founded the series in 1982.

Employment

For 11 straight years (2006–2016), Hope College was listed among the "101 best and brightest companies to work for in West Michigan" survey of the Michigan Business and Professional Association.

Campus renovation

The college marked the completion of the "Greater Hope" campaign in October 2015 with the dedication of the Jack H. Miller Center for Musical Arts. In September 2015, the college dedicated the opening of Kruizenga Art Museum, designed by C Concept Design, and broke ground on construction of the Jim and Martie Bultman Student Center.

As of October 2015, the Jack H. Miller Center for Musical Arts and the Kruizenga Art Museum are open and in use by students and faculty. The Jim and Martie Bultman Student Center opened for the 2017–18 school year.

Athletics

Hope College competes in the MIAA conference, and is a Division III member of the NCAA. It currently fields 20 men's and women's varsity teams. The college has constructed several new outdoor athletic venues in recent years— DeVos Fieldhouse (2005), Boeve Baseball Stadium (2008), Wolters Softball Stadium (2008), Van Andel Soccer Stadium (2009) and Heeringa-Vande Poel Tennis Stadium (2012). The college recently acquired Holland Municipal Stadium from the City of Holland and has renamed it the Ray and Sue Smith in honor of a longtime coach and his wife. In 2006, the women's basketball team won the National Championship in its division, the second in school history.

Hope has won the MIAA All-Sports/Commissioner's Cup Championship more than any other member school. Hope has won the honor a league-leading 34 times. In 2012-13 Hope athletes and/or teams qualified for nine NCAA championships.

The school's athletic teams are called the Flying Dutchmen (men) and the Flying Dutch (women). The school colors are blue and orange (possibly chosen because the Dutch royal family is the House of Orange-Nassau). The college sponsors club ice hockey and rugby in addition to a popular intramural sports program.

National Championships:

 1990: Women's Basketball (NCAA Division III)
 2006: Women's Basketball (NCAA Division III)
 2014: Women's Volleyball (NCAA Division III)
 2022: Women's Basketball (NCAA Division III)

National Runners-up:

 1994: Women's Swimming and Diving (NCAA Division III)
 1995: Men's Swimming and Diving (NCAA Division III)
 1996: Men's Basketball (NCAA Division III)
 1998: Men's Basketball (NCAA Division III)
 2010: Women's Basketball (NCAA Division III)

Club Team National Championships:

 2022: Men's Ice Hockey (ACHA Division III)
 2021: Men's Ice Hockey (ACHA Division III)
 2018: Men's Ice Hockey (ACHA Division III)

Club Team National Runners-up:

 2003: Men's Ice Hockey (ACHA Division III)
 2010: Men's Ice Hockey (ACHA Division III)
 2011: Men's Ice Hockey (ACHA Division III)

The men's and women's basketball teams also take part in a notable rivalry, the Calvin–Hope rivalry.

Notable alumni

Notable alumni and staff of Hope College include:

Students 

 Rychard Bouwens, associate professor at Leiden University
 Dave Brat, former Representative Virginia's 7th congressional district (2014–2019); economics professor at Randolph–Macon College
 Bradley Slagh, Republican member of the Michigan House of Representatives.
 Richard Smalley, Nobel prize-winning chemist
 Watson Spoelstra, American sportswriter
 Morris Steggerda, early 20th century physical anthropologist
 Lynne Stewart, American defense attorney
 Sufjan Stevens, Academy Award Nominated musician, graduated Phi Beta Kappa
 Derek Brown, American saxophonist
 Dick Bulterman, senior researcher at the Centrum Wiskunde & Informatica
 Daniel Allen Butler, American author and playwright
 Sylvia T. Ceyer, Professor and Chair of Chemistry, Massachusetts Institute of Technology
 Robert Danhof, jurist
 Martin De Haan, editor of Our Daily Bread devotional
 Max DePree, writer; industrialist; former CEO of Herman Miller furniture
 John R. Dethmers,   Chief Justice of the Michigan Supreme Court 
 Walter DeVries, political consultant
 Harvey A. DeWeerd, American historian on military affairs
 Kevin DeYoung, author, pastor 
 Gerrit J. Diekema, politician and Speaker of the Michigan House of Representatives
 Jim Dressel, Air Force pilot, and a Michigan politician in the 1970s and early 1980s.
 Amy Gaipa, actress
  Betsy Aardsma, unsolved murder
  Tom Andrews, American poet and critic.
  Jeff Bates, co-founder of Slashdot
 Kathy Beauregard, former director of athletics for Western Michigan University
 James Bosman, New Hampshire politician.
 Patricia G. Gensel, American botanist and paleobotanist.
 Daniel Georges-Abeyie, criminologist and professor
 Robert W. Haack, American banker who served as president of the New York Stock Exchange and chairman of the Lockheed Aircraft Corporation.
  John Hendrickson, American businessman, the chairman, president and chief executive officer (CEO) of Perrigo
  Emily Henry, New York Times bestselling American author
 James G. Herman, American oncologist.
 Gary M. Hieftje, analytical chemist
 Mary C. Hill, American hydrologist
 Pete Hoekstra, former U.S. Representative and Ambassador to the Netherlands (2018–2021)
 Jim Kaat, 25-year Major League Baseball pitcher, National Baseball Hall of Fame and Museum Class of 2022
 Norman J. Kansfield, American minister who is a senior scholar in residence at Drew University
 Seth Kaper-Dale, American Protestant pastor and activist.
 Eugene Marion Klaaren, historian and professor of religion
 Donald Kroodsma, author and ornithologist
 Tim Laman, American ornithologist, wildlife photojournalist and filmmaker.
 Terri Lynn Land, former Michigan Secretary of State
 Doc Lavan, 12-year Major League Baseball player
 Arend Lubbers, president of Grand Valley State University from 1969 to 2001
 Peter J. Maassen, current Justice of the Alaska Supreme Court
 Rob "CmdrTaco" Malda, co-founder of Slashdot
 Rev. Dr. Gregg A. Mast (B.A. 1974), clergyman, president of New Brunswick Theological Seminary (2006–2017)
 Albert H. McGeehan, mayor of Holland, Michigan from 1993–2009.
 Joe Miklosi, Colorado Representative from 2009 to 2013
 Wendell Alverson Miles, federal judge
 John Moolenaar, Representative, Michigan's 4th congressional district
 Craig Morford, former United States Deputy Attorney General
 James Muilenburg, pioneer in the field of rhetorical criticism of the Old Testament.
 A. J. Muste, pacifist, labor, and Civil Rights Movement activist
 Joey Muthengi,  media personality and actress
 Milton J. Nieuwsma, author, Emmy-winning filmwriter and producer
 David A. Noebel, Christian writer
 Saša Petricic, Canadian journalist
 Thomas J. Plewes, retired lieutenant general in the United States Army. 
 Clark V. Poling, military chaplain
 Andy Ponstein, American professional stock car racing driver.
 Willis J. Potts, pediatric surgeon who devised early heart surgeries for children
 Rachel Reenstra, host of Ms. Adventure on Animal Planet
 D. J. Reyburn, Major League Baseball umpire.
 James Ronda, retired Western American historian.
  Michael Schofield, former US college lacrosse player and current coach.
 Matthew A. Scogin, 14th president of Hope College
  Marilyn Scudder, medical missionary in Tanzania for 35 years.
 Ron Schipper, American football coach and college athletics administrator. 
 Robert A. Schuller, televangelist, former preacher on The Hour of Power
 Larry Siedentop, historian
 Eugene Sutton, Episcopal Bishop of Maryland
 William Te Winkle, Wisconsin State Senator
 Nancy Torresen, United States District Judge of the United States District Court for the District of Maine.
 Harold Van Heuvelen, composer and musician
 Eugene van Tamelen, biochemist
 Glenn Van Wieren, American former college basketball
 Al Vanderbush, football coach and college athletics administrator.
 Carol van Voorst, former US ambassador to Iceland (2006–2009)
 Robert E. Van Voorst, American theologian and educator.
 Guy Vander Jagt, former U.S. Representative (1966–1993)
 George F. Veenker, basketball coach at University of Michigan, football coach at U of M and Iowa State
 Maurice Visscher, American cardiovascular physiologist.
 John E. Visser, President of Emporia State University from 1967 to 1984
 Glenn M. Wagner, pastor and author
 Marianne Walck, Chief Research Officer at the Idaho National Laboratory
 David E. White, retired rear admiral in the United States Navy.
 Edward Wichers, US chemist and Associate Director of the National Bureau of Standards from 1958-62.
 Brad Williams, designer and performer of hand puppets on Nickelodeon’s flagship show Pinwheel
 G. I. Williamson, American Reformed theologian, pastor, and author
 Theodore O. Yntema, professor of business at University of Chicago, chairman of Ford Motor Credit Company
 Annette Ziegler, Wisconsin Supreme Court Justice
 Kim Zimmer, four time winner, Daytime Emmy Awards for Outstanding Lead Actress in a Drama Series
 Samuel Marinus Zwemer, scholar, missionary in Arabia

Faculty and staff 

 Susan Atefat-Peckham, Iranian-American poet
 Meredith Blackwell, American mycologist
 James E. Bultman, president of Hope College from 1999 to 2013
 Miguel A. De La Torre, professor of Social Ethics and Latino Studies
 Russ DeVette, head basketball coach at Hope College , 1948 to 1951 and 1956 to 1977
 Bobby Fong, academic and the President of Ursinus College in Collegeville, Pennsylvania.
 James A. Herrick, American academic.
 Charles A. Huttar, emeritus professor of English at Hope College
 Rhoda Janzen, American poet, academic and memoirist
 Margo Jonker, American softball coach
  James Kennedy, American historian
 John C. Knapp, 12th president of Hope College
 Dean Kreps, former American football player and coach
 Samuel Ottmar Mast, American zoologist
 Brian Morehouse, college basketball coach currently serving as the head coach of the Hope Flying Dutch women's basketball team
  David Myers,  professor of psychology
 William Pannapacker, professor of American literature and culture
 Joel Peckham, American poet, scholar of American literature and a creative writer.
 Claudia Polini, Italian mathematician specializing in commutative algebra.
 Patrice Rankine, leading scholar in the area of classical reception
 Jack Ridl, American poet
 Matthew A. Scogin, 14th president of Hope College
 Tony Semple, professional American football, Detroit Lions
  Ray Smith, head football coach at Hope College, 1970 to 1994
 Peter Stuursma, head football coach at Hope College
 Glenn Van Wieren, American former college basketball
 Gordon Van Wylen, physicist and educator
 Al Vanderbush, football coach and college athletics administrator

References

External links

 

 
1862 establishments in Michigan
Buildings and structures in Ottawa County, Michigan
Education in Ottawa County, Michigan
Educational institutions established in 1862
Holland, Michigan
Liberal arts colleges in Michigan
Reformed Church in America